The Collapse of Jiujiang Bridge refers to the partial collapse of a freeway bridge in the city of Foshan, in Guangdong province in the People's Republic of China on June15, 2007. The bridge, which spans the Xijiang River, collapsed at approximately 5:30 AM. It is believed that four cars on the highway, carrying nine passengers, were submerged in the river as a result. Eight bodies were recovered. All ten crew members of the boat were rescued.

References

Bridge disasters in China
Bridge disasters caused by collision
2007 disasters in China
History of Guangdong
Nanhai District